The Church of San Martín (Spanish: Iglesia Parroquial de San Martín) is a church located in Entrena, Spain. It was declared Bien de Interés Cultural in 1984.

References 

Bien de Interés Cultural landmarks in La Rioja (Spain)